Frederick John Pritchard (died January 13, 1931) was an American plant scientist. He was a senior plant physiologist at the United States Department of Agriculture. He developed many disease resistant varieties of tomato.

References

External links
 Pritchard, Frederick John 1874-1931 at WorldCat Identities

1931 deaths